The Gravitron is an amusement ride, most commonly found as a portable ride at fairs and carnivals. The Gravitron first appeared at Morey's Piers in 1983, originally designed and manufactured by Wisdom Industries. It is a modification of an earlier ride called the Rotor.

Names 
The Gravitron is an amusement ride commonly found as a portable ride at fairs and carnivals. It is known by a variety of names, including:

Design and operation

The Gravitron first appeared at Morey's Piers in 1983 and quickly became a fixture at amusement parks in many countries. It is a modification of an earlier ride called the Rotor. The ride was originally designed and manufactured by Wisdom Industries.

The ride is completely enclosed, with 48 padded panels lining the inside wall. Riders lean against these panels, which are angled back. As the ride rotates, the rider experiences a centrifugal force pointing outward from the ride's center. This force, along with the slant in the walls, allows riders to be completely supported by the walls, without their feet touching the ground.

The ride can rotate at a maximum frequency of 24 rpm. It reaches that frequency in less than 20 seconds, due to the 33 kW 3-phase motor. At this point, the riders are experiencing centrifugal force equivalent to three times the force of gravity.

There is usually a light-up sign saying "THRILLER" on the ride, but sometimes the sign says the name of the show. On some models, this is not on the ride.

The ride operator is located in the center of the ride. Part of the operator's duty is to control lighting and music in addition to the ride itself. Some variants include closed-circuit television cameras, allowing waiting riders and passersby to observe the ride in action.

There are a few versions of this ride that do not have a ceiling (i.e. the top canvas is not installed).

The entire ride racks on a single  trailer for transport. The ride can be assembled in less than six hours, and packed up in three.

Incidents
On August 20, 1991, a Gravitron spun itself apart at the Missouri State Fair, injuring seven children. The accident led to a multi-party lawsuit against Murphy Enterprises, the operator of the ride, and Wisdom Manufacturing, resulting in modifications to the rides and stricter safety standards.

In April 2004, an accident occurred at the Dade County Youth Fair in Miami, Florida, when a panel came off and three riders were ejected. One of these ejected riders was a 16-year-old girl who was critically injured. Seven people were injured, including two people outside the ride that were hit by debris. As a result, DCYF strengthened their safety guidelines and removed the ride from the park.

On September 8, 2007, a teenage boy was injured while riding a Gravitron at the Spokane County Interstate Fair in Washington State. The boy hit his head on a metal part of the ride and needed two staples in his scalp to close the wound. Witnesses reported that the boy ignored safety warnings and climbed the walls of the ride while it was in motion. State investigators determined that the ride was safe and that the accident was the result of the victim's behavior.

Locations

 Australia: At least six; Vortex at Dreamworld (removed in 2009) and five traveling models.
 Oahu, Hawaii: One traveling model owned by Wood Ent. Co.; named Area 51
 North America: Believed to be upwards of 40.
 Bahamas: The Holiday Carnival hosts this ride.
 United Kingdom: Alton Towers had this ride for three seasons from 1990 to 1992; it later moved to Pleasure Island. This ride is now located at the Barry Island Pleasure Park near Cardiff.
 Finland: Suomen Tivoli hosts this ride.
 New Zealand: Two are owned by Mahons Amusements, mobile.
 Canada: One is owned by Hinchey's Rides and Amusements, another by West Coast Amusements under the name Alien Abduction, one is owned by Puck's Farm near Toronto, and another is in Vancouver's Pacific National Exhibition, and is called Starship 3000 instead of Gravitron. Another tours Newfoundland every summer with Thomas Amusements, and is called Starship 3000 (previously Starship 2000 before refurbishment). One more Starship 3000 is owned by Albion Amusements, which makes a stop at Wasaga Beach, Ontario. One is also owned by Wild Rose Shows Attractions traveling all over Alberta some places in Saskatchewan, and it is called Area 51.  One is owned by World’s Finest Shows, and it is called Alien Abduction.

Gallery

See also
 Rotor (ride)
 Round Up (ride)
 Tagada

Notes

References

External links

 Patent for the Gravitron Design
 David Burton's Gravitron Page
 Wisdom Rides' Information Page for the Starship 2000

Amusement rides
Amusement rides introduced in 1983